Calpocalyx atlanticus is a species of flowering plant in the family Fabaceae. It is found only in Cameroon.

References

Mimosoids
Flora of Cameroon
Vulnerable plants
Taxonomy articles created by Polbot